The Gadget Show (currently known as The Gadget Show: Shop Smart, Save Money) is a British television series which focuses on consumer technology. The show, which is broadcast on Channel 5, is currently presented by Ortis Deley, Georgie Barrat and Jon Bentley.

Originally a thirty-minute show, it was extended to forty-five minutes, then later to sixty minutes. Repeats have also aired on the digital channel 5Star, syndicated broadcasts on Discovery Science and Dave (in edited down half-hour versions), and Channel 5's on-demand service My5. In Australia, it is aired on The Lifestyle Channel. The Gadget Show has received many Guinness World Records.

Format

2004–2006: Beginnings
The show previews and reviews the latest gadgets, and broadcasts the latest technology news. The show is aimed at giving the mass consumer an insight into the gadget world and in addition, it aims to give enough information for the more "geeky" or knowledgeable audience, but still making it accessible to the more casual viewer. The show has featured Blu-ray Discs, video cameras, MP3 players, Internet multi media tablets and other technologies. A segment showing viewers how to get the most out of their technology was also often included along with a competition to win anything from £5,000 to £45,000 worth of new gadgets. Each series usually contained a special episode focusing on a particular technology conference or expo. Past conferences include CeBIT and the NextFest.

2007–2010: Studio and time increase
Series 5 saw a slight tweak in the format, with the three presenters hosting from a studio base, although a lot of the show still took place outside of the studio. The studio sections were filmed at The Custard Factory on Gibb Street in Digbeth, Birmingham, England. This was until a new set was introduced and the studio was then moved to inside The Gadget Show's offices located inside North One Television in Digbeth. A recurring theme in the updated format was a regular challenge between Jason and Suzi (and occasionally Jon and/or Ortis), typically set around particular gadget(s) and their testing or use based around it. Another addition was that now the week's main featured gadget(s), typically reviewed by Jon, was given a 'G rating' from one to five. The seventh series, which started on 29 October 2007, saw the programme promoted to a 20:00 start time (previously 19:15), and running increased from forty-five minutes to one hour.

From series 8, there was also a new "Top 5" feature which consists of the Top 5 gadgets in a certain category. At the start of the eleventh series, a new item was introduced, called the "Wall of Fame" where Ortis or Suzi and Jason picked their favourite gadget from a particular category that they think changed the face of modern gadgetry, and then Jon picked the one to win and go up on the wall. There were also several other recurring features (such as aforementioned "Top 5", and 'The Focus Group' - testing products with various groups of people, who voted for their best one) which were featured in episodes on a semi-regular basis.

The show also offers a competition, (answering a multiple choice question, by phone, SMS or postal entry) that gives the winner on some occasions up to 250 prizes.

For 2010, the programme received a rebrand centred on the Museo typeface. This included refreshed titles and break bumpers. Also in 2010, the show saw the release of a supporting magazine called 'The Gadget Show Magazine'.
Despite advocating HD content and reviewing high definition television sets, cameras and other devices, the show continued to be produced and broadcast in standard definition, being upscaled on the Channel 5 HD simulcast channel. It would take until the World Tour series for the show to begin broadcasting in native HD.

In August 2011, it was announced a new series of The Gadget Show would be shown on Fridays. However, from 26 September 2011, the show reverted to Mondays, due to strong competition on Friday nights.

2012–2013: World Tour revamp
In February 2012, it was announced that the show would be in a new, revamped format. It was called The Gadget Show: World Tour, and it started airing on 23 April 2012. The new version of the show saw presenters Jason Bradbury and Pollyanna Woodward travelling the world to test the latest gadgets and partake in a number of challenges. The reception of the show from fans, after the first few broadcasts were generally negative, questioning Jon, Ortis and Suzi's drop from the show. 

The next series, under the name The All New Gadget Show, began airing on 5 November 2012. It followed the same format as the previous series known as The Gadget Show: World Tour. Guests in this series included musical-comedy group Jonny & The Baptists as well as popular YouTube star Ali-A. Two specials aired in Spring 2013, a 'future' special and a 'Bank Holiday' special.

2013–2016: Back to origins, presenter changes
For the 17th series, Jason Bradbury and Pollyanna Woodward were joined by Countdown co-presenter Rachel Riley and former Gadget Show presenter Jon Bentley who re-joined the show as chief gadget tester. It was announced that The Gadget Show would return to its more traditional format, with a new studio. On 30 January 2014, it was announced that Ortis Deley would be returning to the show, replacing Pollyanna Woodward. On 25 April 2014, it was announced that Riley would be leaving the show and would be replaced by Olympic skeleton gold medallist, Amy Williams.

From the 22nd series, in-studio presenter links were scrapped; so, the filmed inserts were linked by graphics and countdown clips with voiceover from Bradbury, Deley, Williams and Bentley. A new logo and graphics were also introduced. New features included profiles of YouTube creators and vloggers and a section called Gadget Help where viewers of the show can get tech help to solve their problems. For the 23rd series, the show returned to a Friday night slot for the first time since 2011.

2017–present: Presenter changes, Gadget Show Live axed, and revamp 
At the end of the 24th series of The Gadget Show, it was announced that Bradbury had decided to quit the show after 12 years. A day later, it was confirmed that Amy Williams would also leave. Furthermore, it was also announced that The Gadget Show Live had been axed in 2017 in favour of a new technology show taking place at Westfield London. The 25th series saw the show have a revamp. Channel 5 were keeping quiet as to what would happen in the new series.

On 17 February 2017, it was announced that Craig Charles and Georgie Barrat would replace Amy Williams and Jason Bradbury for the 25th series and would host alongside Ortis Deley and Jon Bentley. It was also announced that the show would return to a studio base in Birmingham and would air from 10 March 2017 for 12 episodes. The new Gadget Show logo teaser was released on the official Facebook page on 14 February 2017.

The show in its 26th and 27th series continued with the hosts from the 25th series with all studio filming taking place to the south of Birmingham in the 'Studio 212' complex operated by the privately owned company drp.

After series 35, Charles confirmed that he would not be returning to the show. For series 36, the format was changed so that the studio was replaced by on location filming at Gadget HQ, a residential property used by the show, and the focus of the show altered to concentrate on assisting families and households with technological solutions to help their lives including money saving with Wallop and sustainability with new experts Charlotte Williams and Bianca Foley. As part of this, Charles' role was discontinued and a replacement was not put in place. For the new format, the name was changed to The Gadget Show: Better Tech, Better Life. In 2023, the name was changed to The Gadget Show: Shop Smart, Save Money.

Guinness World Records

During the challenge section of The Gadget Show, the team is sometimes asked to set new Guinness World Records. So far, they have set records for:
 The fastest speed reached by a slot car racer achieved by Dallas Campbell while filming for The Gadget Show.
 The fastest speed reached by an internal combustion powered radio-controlled model car is 137.86 km/h (85.66 mph), controlled by Jason Bradbury (UK) on the set of The Gadget Show in Stratford-upon-Avon, UK, on 29 October 2008.
 The fastest speed in a water jet–powered car is 26.8 km/h (16.65 mph) and was achieved by Jason Bradbury (UK) on the set of The Gadget Show at Wattisham Airfield, Ipswich, UK, on 15 March 2010.
 The longest ramp jump performed by a remote controlled model car is 26.18 m achieved by an HPI Vorza, controlled by Jason Bradbury (UK) on the set of The Gadget Show in Birmingham, UK, on 25 March 2010. (Since been beaten by Thomas Strobel, Germany on 30 July 2011. Setting a distance of 36.9 m.)
 The largest game of Tetris measured at 105.79 m² and was played on The Gadget Show in Birmingham, UK on 15 September 2010.
 The heaviest machine moved using a brain control interface weighs 56.2 tonnes (61.95 tons), as demonstrated on the set of The Gadget Show, Studley (UK) on 17 March 2011.
 The fastest speed attained on a jet-powered street luge is 115.83 mph (186.41 km/h), achieved by Jason Bradbury (UK) on the set of The Gadget Show's 200th episode in Bentwaters Parks, Suffolk, UK, on 9 August 2011.
 The longest loop-de-loop performed by a radio-controlled car at a diameter of 2.3 m.

Failed campaigns

The show launched a campaign for free WiFi access across the country. Viewers were urged to register their support on the show's website; Jason Bradbury promised to take the issue to 10 Downing Street if the need arose, which it did, but got a reply rejecting his petition after over 30,000 names were sent in.

In 2015, the show (and Worth Capital) also launched a "Future Gadget" competition which gave all budding entrepreneurial tech' inventors a chance to bring their new gadgets to market, with financial backing and advert space on Channel 5 for the overall tech winner. This competition was also to run alongside The Gadget Show Live 2015 in parallel as part of the selection process. This competition itself was terminated early on as the show and Worth Capital felt that the initial entries were not to the highest of standards. Another major online media source suggested that a severe lack of investors, the enduring lengthy format processes as well as some of the terms and conditions (such as the equity stakes the entrants would have to give up when signing strict contracts) was the real reasons for the demise of this competition. The trust between the most loyal of fans and the show itself was heavily damaged as a conclusive result of this early cancellation.

Series overview

Notes
 Series numbers were later changed to exclude the World Tour and All New Gadget Show from current series listing. The series which started airing on 9 March 2018 is listed as Series 27.

Presenters

Current presenters
 Jon Bentley (2004–12, 2013–present)
 Ortis Deley (2009–12, 2014–present)
 Georgie Barrat (2017–present)

Experts
 Harry Wallop: technology money saving expert (2017–present)
 Charlotte Williams: sustainability expert (2022–present)
 Bianca Foley: sustainability expert (2022–present)

Note: Jon Bentley is the only original presenter left and is the longest running current presenter.

Former presenters

 Jason Bradbury (2004–2016) - 329 episodes (including 20 episodes of World Tour)
 Suzi Perry (2004–2012) - 208 episodes
 Tom Dunmore (2004-2006, 2010) - 30 episodes (plus 2 as guest)
 Adrian Simpson (2004) - 4 episodes
 Aleks Krotoski (2004) - 2 episodes
 Spencer Kelly (2005-2006) - 13 episodes
 Dallas Campbell (2008) - 23 episodes
 Gail Porter (2009) - 7 episodes
 Pollyanna Woodward (2010–2014) - 98 episodes (including 20 episodes of World Tour)
 Rachel Riley (2013–2014) - 31 episodes 
 Amy Williams (2014–2016) - 63 episodes (plus 1 as guest in 2010)
 Yue Xu (2015-2016) - 16 episodes (plus 1 as guest in 2014)
 Craig Charles (2017–2022) - 131 episodes
 Maddie Moate (2022) - 1 episode
 Libby Clegg (2022) - 1 episode
 Pien Meulensteen (2022) - 1 episode
 Jordan Erica Webber (2022) - 1 episode
 Nicola Hume (2022) - 1 episode
 Grace Webb (2022) - 1 episode

Experts
 Jordan Erica Webber: gaming expert (2017–2022) - 73 episodes (plus 1 as guest presenter)

Notes
 Stand-in for Suzi Perry who was suffering ectopic pregnancy
 Stand-in for Georgie Barrat who was on maternity leave

Gadget Show Web TV
 Dionne South (2008–2011) - 101 episodes
 Jon Bentley (2008-2011) - 109 episodes
 Ortis Deley (2009-2010) - 51 episodes
 Pollyanna Woodward (2010) - 11 episodes
 Amy Roff (2009) - 1 episode

Theme tune
The original theme tune used from 2004 to 2011 was composed by Barrie Gledden and was entitled "In the Machine".

In Episode 4 of Series 16, Perry and Bradbury were challenged to create a new theme tune for The Gadget Show which would replace the current one used since the show's first broadcast using only consumer tech. Jason decided that he would use DJing software and equipment to compose his theme, whereas Suzi opted for using apps available on the iPad 2 to compose her version. After the show, viewers were encouraged to vote for their favourite of the two on The Gadget Show's website, with the version receiving the most votes being chosen as the new theme. At the start of the next episode, it was revealed that Suzi's version was chosen by viewers and was first used in the opening titles of that episode.

A revised version of the theme, including 'drumbeat' elements, accompanied the World Tour series.

Between series 17 and 24, a theme credited to Andy Duggan was used. It was similar sonically to the first and third themes, melodically following on from the immediately prior (World Tour) theme but with electronic overtones akin to those of the original music.

Between series 25 to 35, Full Funk Force by Steven Ryder was used as the theme. From series 36, a new theme has been used.

Website and YouTube channel
The Gadget Show website, which now is part of Channel 5's 5FWD website, contains information on topics and products discussed and featured on the show. In addition, the site contains product reviews, how-tos, news, and free 'web episodes', containing extra material not featured on the TV programme.

The Gadget Show also has a YouTube channel which features special behind the scenes videos and Web TV episodes.

Gadget Show Live

The Gadget Show Live was an exhibition that showcased the latest in technology from different sectors. It took place annually at the Birmingham National Exhibition Centre, and allowed visitors the chance to test and buy the latest technology in the market.

The show encompassed a variety of different features which in the past have included Battlefield Live, Robo Challenge Arena, Toy Arena, Game Zone, Future Tech Zone, Photographic Stage and The HUB. The show's most infamous feature is the Super Theatre, an exclusive hour-long interactive theatre show hosted by the presenters.

In 2013, the show took place 3–7 April, in 2014 it took place 9–13 April, in 2015 it took place 7–12 April and in 2016 it took place between 31 March and 3 April.

In 2017, the show was dropped by organisers Upper Street Events in favour of a new event at Westfield London.

Books
 The Gadget Show: Big Book of Cool Stuff (Black Dog Press, 14 October 2021)

See also
 Click
 Gadget Geeks
 Tomorrow's World

References

External links
 
 The Gadget Show Live
 The Gadget Show YouTube Channel
 

British non-fiction television series
Channel 5 (British TV channel) original programming
2004 British television series debuts
2010s British television series
2020s British television series
English-language television shows
Television series by All3Media